Clermont-Soubiran is a commune in the Lot-et-Garonne department in south-western France.

Geography
The Barguelonne forms most of the commune's south-eastern border.

See also
Communes of the Lot-et-Garonne department

References

Clermontsoubiran